Danger Close Games (formerly DreamWorks Interactive LLC and EA Los Angeles) was an American video game developer based in Los Angeles. The company was founded in March 1995 as joint venture between DreamWorks SKG and Microsoft (later moved to Microsoft Games) under the name DreamWorks Interactive, with studios in Redmond, Washington, and Los Angeles.

In February 2000, the Los Angeles studio of DreamWorks Interactive was acquired by Electronic Arts and renamed EA Los Angeles, and to Danger Close Games in 2010. The studio's sole responsibility after 2010 was to develop games in the Medal of Honor franchise. When the series was put on hold in January 2013, Danger Close was shut down, with some staff moving on to DICE LA (now Ripple Effect Studios), a Los Angeles studio of DICE, another subsidiary of Electronic Arts.

History

As DreamWorks Interactive (1995–2000) 
DreamWorks SKG and Microsoft announced on March 22, 1995, that they were establishing a videogame development company, DreamWorks Interactive LLC, as a joint venture following a Microsoft investment that acquired a minority stake in DreamWorks SKG as a whole. The studio's operations were to be set up in Los Angeles, California, with a smaller group near Microsoft headquarters in Redmond, Washington. Both Microsoft and DreamWorks initially invested $30 million in the studio, which would soon be employing 75 people.

Steven Spielberg was primarily responsible for negotiations with Microsoft to establish DreamWorks Interactive, which secured funding for the studio. To manage DreamWorks Interactive, Microsoft relocated one of its executive game producers, Alan Hartman, while film industry veteran Glenn Entis served as the studio's CEO following DreamWorks' acquisition of Pacific Data Images. John A. S. Skeel, one of the founders of DreamWorks Interactive, led the Redmond studio, primarily responsible for publishing games developed by independent studios.

On June 1, 1995, DreamWorks SKG and Silicon Graphics formed a $50 million agreement to create a new computer animation system using hardware and software. Initially focused on the movie industry, the alliance between the companies was also connected with the creation of DreamWorks Interactive, which, adding to Microsoft's financing and technologies, would also be used in video games. On March 25, 1997, the company signed a distribution deal with Electronic Arts.

According to Leslie Helm of the Los Angeles Times, the company's initial computer game titles were relatively unsuccessful. Its biggest hit by August 1997 was Goosebumps: Escape from Horrorland, with sales of 130,000 units, according to PC Data. Helm called this "a modest success". In 1996, Microsoft moved DreamWorks SKG art director Matt Hall to DreamWorks Interactive with the goal of creating a new first-person shooter game franchise based on the Spielberg concept.

In 1999, the studio saw its most successful release with first-person shooter video game Medal of Honor, published by Electronic Arts on October 31, 1999 for PlayStation. Medal of Honor laid the groundwork for historic war-based combat games, ultimately leading to Activision's Call of Duty series.  However, the studio's reputation had been hampered by the 1998 release of Trespasser, a game based on the Jurassic Park franchise. Trespasser had numerous technical flaws in attempting to create a realistic physics engine, and introduced mechanics that were considered awkward at the time of its release, such as the player having separate control of the player-character's limbs. The title sold only 50,000 units and is considered one of the worst video games of all time, and left Steven Spielberg, one of the owners of DreamWorks, in doubt about continuing a video game company.

Under Electronic Arts (2000–2013) 
With DreamWorks losing interest in maintaining a video game division, Electronic Arts acquired the Los Angeles studio of DreamWorks Interactive from DreamWorks and Microsoft in February 24, 2000, acquiring the intellectual property and rights of the acclaimed series Medal of Honor from Microsoft/DreamWorks. Analysts at The Wall Street Journal estimate the purchase cost around $10 million. The company was renamed EA Los Angeles and focused on developing titles in the Medal of Honor series, releasing Medal of Honor: Underground the same year. On August 6, 2003, EA Los Angeles moved from their offices in Bel Air to a new campus in Playa Vista. On that campus, the studio was merged with EA Pacific in 2003, and received some employees from previously closed Westwood Studios, leading EA Los Angeles to start working in the Command & Conquer series.

The Redmond studio's operations were consolidated within Microsoft, which at the time was founding its own in-house video game division, Microsoft Games. As a result, DreamWorks Interactive head Alan Hartman became Digital Anvil's head of studio, with remaining DWI Redmond employees moving to the newly founded Turn 10 Studios.

In July 2010, EA Los Angeles was rebranded to Danger Close Games to focus on the development of Medal of Honor games. With the rebranding referencing a term from the Medal of Honor series, the studio would exclusively focus on the Medal of Honor games. Their first project was the 2010 Medal of Honor, which was released for Microsoft Windows, PlayStation 3, and Xbox 360 on October 12, 2010. A follow-up, Medal of Honor: Warfighter, was released on October 23, 2012. In January 2013, Electronic Arts announced that the Medal of Honor series was taken 'out of rotation' and put on hold, following to the poor reception received by Warfighter. With this move, Danger Close was effectively closed; some developers moved to other EA studios, while others left the Los Angeles area. Some senior staff of Danger Close formed the groundwork for DICE LA, a sub-studio of EA DICE, which was formed in May 2013.

Games developed

As DreamWorks Interactive

As EA Los Angeles

As Danger Close Games

References 

American companies disestablished in 2013
American companies established in 1995
Electronic Arts
DreamWorks Pictures
1995 establishments in California
2000 mergers and acquisitions
2013 disestablishments in California
Companies based in Los Angeles
Defunct companies based in Greater Los Angeles
Playa Vista, Los Angeles
Video game companies based in California
Video game companies disestablished in 2013
Video game companies established in 1995
Defunct video game companies of the United States
Video game development companies
Former Microsoft subsidiaries